T58, T.58 or T-58 may refer to :
 Cooper T58, a 1961 Formula One car built by Cooper
 General Electric T58, 1955 United States turboshaft engine developed for helicopters
 Slingsby T.58, a British glider

and also :
 T58, Ironhead Airport FAA LID
 T58, a Wheelchair racing class
 T-58, an active Indian Navy Seaward class defense boat